Kurt Schattelbauer (born 3 December 1940) is an Austrian former cyclist. He won the Austrian National Road Race Championships in 1973. He was born in Graz, his profession is a farmer.

References

External links
 

1940 births
Living people
Austrian male cyclists
Place of birth missing (living people)